Ahmedpur East or Ahmedpur Sharqia, also spelled Ahmadpur, Ahmed Pur or Ahmad Pur, is a city in Bahawalpur District, Punjab province, Pakistan. It is the headquarters of Ahmadpur East Tehsil. It is the 69th largest city of Pakistan according to the 2017 census.

Culture 
The city of Ahmedpur East is a tourist destination for not only locals but provides an important hot spot for historians and archaeologists due to its rich heritage. The City Contains Sadiq Garh Palace Which Was Built In 1302 By Nawab Sadiq I And Many Old Buildings. The Derawar Fort is also in Ahmadpur East Tehsil Ahmedpur East is known for its cotton, silk, embroidery, carpets, and extraordinarily delicate pottery.

Ahmedpur East Nuclear Power Complex 
According to The Wall Street Journal, Pakistan Atomic Energy Commission (PAEC) plans to install three Chinese nuclear reactors at Ahmedpur East and the site is now being prepared. Ahmedpur East Nuclear Power Complex would have 1100 MW Nuclear reactor.

2017 Oil tanker fire disaster 

In 2017, Ahmedpur East was the site of a major disaster, when over 200 villagers collecting fuel from an overturned truck were killed in an accidental explosion. More than 70 among the injured died in burn centers. Updated numbers indicate that at least 200 people died in the explosion.
The death toll of Ahmadpur East oil tanker tragedy reached to 219 when another victim died at the Nishtar Hospital, Multan.

As many as 94 victims died in different hospitals, including 18 at Jinnah Hospital, Lahore, 11 at Burns Ward of CMH, Bahawalpur, and 10 at Bahawal Victoria Hospital. However, 34 injured persons are still under treatment at different hospitals, including 22 at BVH, five at THQ Hospital, Ahmadpur East, three at Nishtar Hospital, Multan, and four at Jinnah Hospital, Lahore.

According to focal person appointed for giving details about the tragedy Dr Amir Mahmood, 31 injured persons had been discharged after recovery. Meanwhile, relatives of several Ahmadpur East tragedy victims alleged that their financial aid cheque issued by the district government on the order of Punjab CM Shahbaz Sharif had bounced by the banks concerned. The DC Office spokesman through the Information Department said that the claim was not true. The spokesperson said that if any cheque did not cash then the concerned families should immediately contact the DC Office.

Education Facilities in Ahmadpur East 
Apart from an army public school at Dera Nawab Sahib, the cities contain two government postgraduate colleges. The city also contains a government commerce college, Government Sadiq Abbas degree college and a college for individuals who require special education. Many private colleges such as Punjab College, Nimz College, Allama Iqbal College, United College, Millat College, Laurel College, City College, Oxford College, Amal College and many more are working there. The campus of a Virtual University is also working there. There are about ten government high schools in the city and nearby. The city contains hundreds of private schools. Some of them are Allied School, Islamic Model Higher Secondary School, Country School System, The Educators, Dr AQ School System, The Smart School, Dar-e-Arqam School, The Arqam School System, EFA School System, The PACE School System and many more.

The Saints of Ahmadpur Tehsil
(1) Syed Mohammad Abdullah Shah Madni Jilani, great grand son of Syed Abdul Rehman Jilani Dehlvi and a descendant of Sheikh Abdul Qadir Jilani. Born and raised in Medina, he walked miles between Mecca and Madina in the heat.  He then spent least 12 years of service at the Masjid-e-Nabwi and had a dream where Mohammad ordered him to find his murshid Sultan Bahu. He met Sultan Bahu on the 12th Rabi' al-awwal. During the reign of Nawab Bahawal Khan III, he migrated from Medina to Ahmadpur East for a permanent residence from 29th Ramazan 1241 H/6 May 1826 AD. He died on Friday of 29th Ramazan 1276 H/20 April 1860. His shrine is situated at Fatani Chowk, Fatani Street, Ahmadpur East. He was the 26th Shaikh of the Sarwari Qadri Order.

(2) Makhdoom Bahaudin Akbar, belonging to Bahaudin Zikarya’s 18th generation of descendants. He migrated from Multan to Ahmadpur East. He died in 26 Ramazan 1267/24 January 1851. He belongs to the Suhrawardiyya Order.

(3) Azmat Sultan, a descendant of Sultan Bahu. His father, Sultan Mohammad Hussain was a Sufi dervish. Azmat Sultan migrated to Ahmadpur East along with his family and resided there. It was here that he died and his shrine is also located here.

(4) Abdul Asad Khan Afghan: There is a khanqah by the name of Abdul Asad Khan in Ahmadpur East. He is known as being the khalifah of Khawaja Aaqil Mohammad.

(5) Noor Shah Bukhari: In Ahmadpur Sharqia, his shrine is located near Qilla Tehsil. He is from the progeny of Syed Jalal Bukhari. He spent most of his time in the Zikr of Allah. The order of his followers initiated at the desert area.

(6) Molvi Hakeem Gul Mohammad: His khanqah exists in Ahmadpur East. His family was prominent for its knowledge and herbal tips. The shrines of his ancestors still exist in Multan and Uch, Pakistan. He was the khalifah and a disciple of Aaqil Mohammad. His family lineage and biography is preserved in his writing Takmala Sharif.

(7) Khawaja Muhammad Abdul Malik Siddique belongs to Ahmad Pur East. He was the Peer-e-Tariqat of Naqashbandi Golden Chain. Khawaja Muhammad Abdul Malik Siddique was Khalifa of Peer Fazal Ali Qureshi of Miskeen Pur sharif District Muzaffar Garh. Now his son Khawaja Abdul Majid Siddiqui is the Sajjada Nasheen of Khanqah Malikia. Khanqah. Khawaja Abdul Majid Siddiqu is Khalifa of Peer Shaikh Mufti Muhammad Fareed Sahib in Naqashbandi.

(8) Molana Mansur Ahmed Faizi from Ahmedpur East was an amzing scholar and sufi from Chishtia order

References

Populated places in Bahawalpur District
Cities in Punjab (Pakistan)